Dasht-e Beyza (also Romanized as Dasht-e Beyẕā; also known as Dasht Ebiza) is a village in Surmaq Rural District, in the Central District of Abadeh County, Fars Province, Iran. At the 2006 census, its population was 48, in 18 families.

References 

Populated places in Abadeh County